The Daughtry/Goo Goo Dolls Summer was a co-headlining concert tour by American rock bands Daughtry and the Goo Goo Dolls. The tour was in support of their studio albums Baptized (2013) and Magnetic (2013). The tour began on June 12, 2014, and ended on August 23, 2014, but was expanded to include two more dates and ended on August 30.

Background
The tour was first announced on March 10, 2014.

About the tour Goo Goo Dolls front man, John Rzeznik says, "We are excited to finally be teaming up with Daughtry." "Not only are we huge fans of Chris, but we think this is going to be a huge party for the fans of both of our bands. The combination of the two will make for an awesome summer night of great American rock music."

Concert synopsis
The Goo Goo Dolls' set lasted for eighty-five minutes, Daughtry played for eighty, while opener Plain White T's started the show by playing for thirty. During the Goo Goo Dolls set bass player Robby Takac sang lead for a few songs.

Opening act
Plain White T's

Setlists

Tour dates

Box office score data

Critical reception
The Digital Journals, Markos Papadatos says of the Goo Goo Dolls, "Overall, the Goo Goo Dolls gave Long Island, New York, a night of acoustic, rock and adult contemporary music to remember. It is no wonder that they have been around for well over two decades and they have always managed to stay relevant despite the changes in the music industry."

Sophia June of the Daily Emerald says, "Upon the first glance, the nights lineup seemed a bit random-like creating an unconventional meal out of the last ingredients in your pantry. I wasn't convinced the three bands had much cohesion until the Goo Goo Dolls third song-"Slide". Goo Goo Dolls are a blending of the melodic, harmony-laden romantic Plain White T's and the rock energy and driving electric guitar of Daughtry."

John Serba from M. Live gave the show 2½ stars out of 4, and said that he felt like Daughtry sounded generic and that the Goo Goo Dolls "ring true". About Daughtry he said that they were "skirting the edge of aggro-rock at times – the type of sound that might benefit from a more dynamic light show than what nature provides on a mild summer evening. Although the crowd responded with more enthusiasm to songs such as "Over You", "It's Not Over" and "Battleships", Daughtry's set sometimes lacked punch". For the Goo Goo Dolls, a highlight is when they performed "Rebel Beat". When comparing the two bands, Daughtry is stronger at singing and the Good Goo Dolls are stronger at songwriting.

Sioux City Journals Bruce R. Miller said, "While the two acts couldn't have been more dissimilar, they helped show just how far that "rock" label can stretch", "Daughtry followed a more familiar path, Goo Goo Dolls went an alternate route." The showmanship between the two was also different. When Goo Goo Dolls bass player Robby Takac took over on lead vocals on a few songs he didn't receive the same reaction as John Rzeznik did.

Personnel
Daughtry
Chris Daughtry – Lead vocals, rhythm guitar
Josh Steely – Lead guitar, backing vocals
Brian Craddock – Rhythm guitar, backing vocals
Josh Paul –  Bass guitar
Elvio Fernandes – Keyboards, piano, backing vocals
Jamal Moore – Drums, percussion

Goo Goo Dolls
John Rzeznik – Lead vocals, guitar
Robby Takac – Bass guitar, lead vocals, backing vocals
Brad Fernquist – Guitar, mandolin, saxophone, backing vocals
Korel Tunador – Keyboards, guitar, saxophone, backing vocals
Craig McIntyre – Drums, percussion

References

External links
Daughtry's Official Website
Goo Dolls' Official Website

2014 concert tours
Co-headlining concert tours
Daughtry (band) concert tours
Goo Goo Dolls concert tours